Dionne Simpson (b. 1972) is a Jamaican Canadian textile artist based in Toronto, Ontario.

Early life and education
Simposon was born in Jamaica in 1972. She emigrated to Canada with her family as an infant. Simpson studied at the Cooper Union in the late nineties and graduated from the Ontario College of Art and Design in 2000.

Career
Simpson's work features a West African textile technique that involves pulling thread through canvas. Within the spaces the thread pulling creates she adds pigments to further embellish the canvas. 

In 2004 Simpson was the first national winner of the RBC Canadian Painting Competition. She won the award for her piece Urban e_Scape 13.

References

1972 births
Living people
Canadian people of Jamaican descent
Canadian textile artists
OCAD University alumni
Black Canadian artists
21st-century women textile artists
21st-century textile artists
21st-century Canadian women artists